Ball Township is located in Sangamon County, Illinois. As of the 2010 census, its population was 6,701 and it contained 2,403 housing units.  The township's offices are located Glenarm.  Portions of the village of Chatham are located in this township.

Geography

References

External links
City-data.com
Illinois State Archives

Townships in Sangamon County, Illinois
Springfield metropolitan area, Illinois
Townships in Illinois